The Gibraltar Social Democrats (GSD) is a liberal-conservative, centre-right political party in Gibraltar. The GSD was the governing party for four successive terms in office under the leadership of Peter Caruana, from the 1996 general election until the party's electoral defeat in the 2011 election by the GSLP–Liberal Alliance.

On 30 November 2017, the party underwent their second leadership election as its leader, Daniel Feetham, resigned in July. As a result, 60.6% of the votes (from executives and members of the party) had gone to support rejoined GSD member, Keith Azopardi, who was a minister and Deputy Chief Minister under the first few years of Peter Caruana's run as Chief Minister. Azopardi had beaten interim leader Roy Clinton, who had gained 39.4% of the votes.

History
The party emerged, after the collapse of the Association for the Advancement of Civil Rights, as the main opposition to the Gibraltar Socialist Labour Party (GSLP).

In 2005, the GSD merged with the Gibraltar Labour Party, retaining the GSD name for the enlarged party. The merger was unpopular with many members of both parties, causing some high-profile GSD members to resign their membership, including deputy leader Keith Azopardi and executive member Nick Cruz, who went on to form the short-lived Progressive Democratic Party.

In January 2013, Peter Caruana (who was the then Leader of the Opposition), announced he was stepping down as leader and taking up a backbench position until his 4-year term was over. Caruana declared that he would not fight the next election and will be stepping out of politics completely. The leadership was contested by two GSD MPs: Daniel Feetham and Damon Bossino. Feetham was elected on 4 February 2013 as Leader of the party by majority vote of the executive. This was the first time a party's leadership was to be democratically contested between two candidates.

Policies

The GSD has been described as liberal-conservative and centre-right. The party supports the current constitutional status of Gibraltar as an autonomous British overseas territory and is opposed to any proposal of joint British–Spanish sovereignty. The GSD has traditionally been less hostile in its attitude to Spain than its main rival, the Gibraltar Socialist Labour Party.

Elections
In the 1991 by-election to the Gibraltar House of Assembly, following the resignation of GSD Leader Peter Montegriffo, Peter Caruana was elected party leader and won 61.81% of the popular vote to fill in the vacant seat.

In the 1992 election, the party won 20.2% of the popular vote and 7 seats.

In the 1996 election, the party won 52.20% of the popular vote and 8 seats.

In the 2000 election, the party won 58.35% of the popular vote and 8 seats.

In the 2003 election, the party won 51.45% of the popular vote and 8 seats.

In the 2007 election to the newly named (and reorganised) Gibraltar Parliament, the party won 49.33% of the popular vote and 10 seats.

In the 2011 election, the party won 46.76% of the popular vote and 7 seats, unable to secure a fifth term.

In the 2013 by-election, the GSD candidate Marlene Hassan Nahon won 39.95% of the popular vote.

In the 2015 election, the party won 31.56% of the popular vote and 7 seats.

The GSD endorsed the Conservative Party in the 2015 British general election.

In the 2019 election, the party won 25.6% of the popular vote and 7 seats.

Election results

Parliament of Gibraltar

By-elections

European Parliament
Gibraltar was part of the South West England constituency in the European parliament and its major parties formed joint ticket alliances with the major UK parties. From 2004 until Brexit, the Gibraltar Social Democrats were in an alliance with the Conservatives.

Current GSD MPs
 Daniel Feetham (since 2007)
 Edwin Reyes (since 2007)
 Elliott Phillips (since 2015) 
 Roy Clinton (since 2015)
 Keith Azopardi (since 2019) (Leader of the Opposition)
 Damon Bossino (since 2019)

List of Leaders

References

External links
 Gibraltar Social Democrats official website

Political parties in Gibraltar
Conservative parties in British Overseas Territories